Phil Clarke (1922-2010) was an English speedway rider.

Speedway career 
Clarke was a leading speedway rider in the 1950s. He reached the final of the Speedway World Championship in the 1955 Individual Speedway World Championship.

He rode in the top tier of British Speedway, riding for Norwich Stars.

World final appearances

Individual World Championship
 1955 -  London, Wembley Stadium - 14th - 2pts

References 

1922 births
2010 deaths
British speedway riders
Norwich Stars riders